The Three Gorges are three adjacent gorges along the middle reaches of the Yangtze River, in the hinterland of the People's Republic of China. With a subtropical monsoon climate, they are known for their scenery. The "Three Gorges Scenic Area" is classified as a AAAAA scenic area (the highest level) by the China National Tourism Administration.

The Three Gorges—comprising the Qutang, Wu, and Xiling gorges—span , beginning at Baidi City of Chongqing, in the west and ending at Nanjing Pass, at Yichang City, Hubei Province, in the east, between which are the Fengjie and Wu Mountains of Chongqing, as well as Badong, Zigui, and Yichang of Hubei Province.

Course of the Yangtze River 

After arriving at Yibin, in Sichuan Province, the Yangtze River flows from Jiangjin, of Chongqing Municipality, to Yichang, of Hubei Province; and this section of the river is called Chuanjiang, or "the river of Sichuan". In the past, it was the only waterway that connected Sichuan and Guizhou to China's eastern area. (The Wu River flows past Guizhou and empties into the Yangtze River at Fuling, of Chongqing Municipality). Downstream, the Chuanjiang passes the Wu Mountains—the second ladder of the Chinese mainland—which form the Qutang Gorge, the Wu Gorge, and the Xiling Gorge along the Yangtze River, which is where this area gets its name.

Three Gorges region 

The Three Gorges span from the western, upriver, cities of Fengjie and Yichang, in Chongqing Municipality, to the east, downstream, to Hubei province.

Although it is primarily famous for its scenery, the Three Gorges region is historically and culturally important in China. Many settlements and archaeological sites were submerged by the upstream reservoir of the Three Gorges Dam.

The Three Gorges

Geological evolution 
Due to the lithological conditions of its different regions, the valleys of the Three Gorges are narrow in some areas and broad in others. Most narrow valleys occur in regions where there is limestone, which is relatively hard and resists erosion. However, water can flow along deep vertical fractures, eroding underneath. As the limestone bed is gradually undercut, parts of it fall into the river along vertical fractures, forming precipitous cliffs. When the river flows through areas of softer sandstone and shale, which have less resistance to erosion, the erosive effect is increased, carving wide valleys.

There are different theories on how the Three Gorges were formed, but geographers and geologists have generally reached a consensus, believing mountain folding in the east of Sichuan Province and the west of Hubei Province, including the Wu Mountains, were the outcome of the Yanshanian movement around 70 million years ago. The gorges run from southwest to northeast, then turn, and from west to east, with terrain lowering gradually from south to north. The western and eastern parts of the area, between the southern mountains and Bashan Mountain, in the north, are comparatively lower; and in the past, the river flowed to the east through the region. As the crust of the locality continued to rise, the river's erosion intensified, and the Three Gorges were carved.

Scenic grandeur 
The natural beauty of the Three Gorges along the Yangtze River has been appreciated for hundreds of years. In the Northern Wei dynasty, Li Daoyuan described them in his work, Commentary on the Water Classic.

There are seamless mountains on both sides of the Three Gorges stretching more than 200 miles. The overlapping rocks make up layers of barriers that shield against sky and sunshine so that the sun can only be seen at noon and the moon will merely show at midnight. In summers, water rises to lofty mountains, making all boats floating along or against the river get blocked. Suppose an empire has an urgent decree to issue from Baidi, it will reach Jiangling at sunset of the day. The distance between them is about 373 miles, and neither a galloping horse nor a flight can run faster than a boat.

Yuan Shansong of the Eastern Jin dynasty wrote a Record of Yichuan's Landscape, which depicts the Three Gorges' grandeur. He wrote,

People were always warned literally or orally of the Gorges' swift currents, saying they are horrific, and no one praised the local landscape [as] beautiful. It's [not] till I came to the site that I felt quite gleeful and started to understand seeing is believing. The overlapping cliffs, the elegant peaks and the grotesque structures, they all constitute the scenery far from expression. The lush, solemn woods stood erected in the cloudy air. I can raise up my head to appreciate what's above, and look down to see reflections, and the more acquainted I get with this place, the better I feel. I spent two nights there, forgetting to return. I had never seen such a scene, nor had I any similar experience. So I am cheerful to see such a wonder, I feel mountains and waters all had spirits, and I am thrilled to encounter this bosom friend after seeking so long.

In his poem Setting out from Baidicheng, Li Bai depicts this place, saying,

While monkeys keep howling at both sides of the river, the boat has swiftly passed thousands of mountains.

Between winter and spring, the shadows of rocks and woods are reflected in the green pool accompanied by white, swift currents. Cascades plunge and flow across cypresses increasing at extremely high peaks. Clean water, flourishing trees, lofty mountains and luxuriant grasses compose the landscape. When the sun starts to rise or frost falls in the morning, forests and streams are chilly and solemn, and one can often hear monkeys howling from peaks. Their cries sound sad and strange and last in the valleys for quite a while, because of that, local fishers think the Wu Gorge is the longest of the Three Gorges in the east of Sichuan province.

The Three Gorges have renowned scenic spots, such as the Kuimen, located at the western entrance to the Three Gorges. The cliffs on both sides appear to some as having been cut by knives or axes. Among the Wu Mountains that are located at the northern and southern beaches of the Wu Gorge, one of the twelve peaks is known as Fairy Peak. According to folk tradition, it symbolizes a fairy who assisted Yu the Great in controlling the waters and guiding boatmen. The Xiling Gorge comprises a series of famous gorges, including Military Book and Sword Gorge, Yellow Cow Gorge, and Lantern's Shadow Gorge.

Hydroelectric projects at the Three Gorges 

In 1919, after Sun Yat-sen had put forward the concept in the Plan for Industrial Development of his , experts investigated damming the Three Gorges, but it was not until 1994 that the Three Gorges project officially started.

In 1944, the Nationalist government recruited John L. Savage, the Chief Engineer of the United States Bureau of Reclamation, who came to China and made a 10-day investigation of the Three Gorges. Afterwards, he wrote an enthusiastic report on the prospects of a dam. Construction was started on the first of the dams at Upper Tsing Yuan Tung, but was halted on August 15, 1947, because of the Chinese Civil War.

In February 1958, as the expanded meeting of the Political Bureau of the CPC Central Committee was held at Nanning, the Three Gorges Project was discussed for the first time, and fierce disputes broke out. In the end, this project was delayed. Over the following three decades, people continued to discuss it. In the early 1980s, people mentioned it once again, but after repeated discussions and investigations, it was again postponed. On March 6, 1992, a feasibility report was presented at the 5th Session of the 7th National People's Congress (NPC) for discussion and resolution. On April 3 of that year, 2,633 NPC members, one-third of the whole body, voted for the Resolution on the Development of the Three Gorges Project, and this was unprecedented in the voting history of the People's Republic of China. The Three Gorges Project officially began on December 14, 1994.

Three Gorges Dam 

The Three Gorges Dam was constructed at Sandouping, Yichang in Hubei Province, in the middle of Xiling Gorge. The project was completed by the end of 2008, with a ship lift completed in 2015.

Both the dam and the Three Gorges Reservoir has had a massive impact on the region's ecology and people, involving the mass relocation of towns and villages. The higher water level has changed the scenery of the Three Gorges so that the river is wider and the mountains appear lower. However, the mountains still tower above the river, and the gorges continue to offer views of the surrounding cliffs.

The riverboat companies operating on the Three Gorges are experiencing an increase in demand for river cruises. The increased width and depth of the river permits larger ships through the gorges, and there has been a significant increase in river traffic of all kinds, including bulk cargo and container barges.

Threatened cultural sites 
The "Baiheliang hydrographic mark"—In 763, during the Guangde period of the Tang dynasty emperor Daizong, people discovered about 165 paragraphs of an inscription with almost 30,000 characters. There are 18 carps carved in the stone along with the inscription, and they were used as hydrographic markers to record water fluctuations during low-water periods, to forecast agricultural outcomes. According to an initial estimate, after the reservoir is filled by the Three Gorges Dam, parts of Baiheliang, with 20 years of records, would be submerged. In 2001, Ge Xiurun, a member of the Chinese Academy of Sciences proposed to use an "unstressed container" to safeguard the original site underneath the water and to construct tunnels to connect it to the ground above so that visitors can have access.
Built between 1796 and 1820, during the reign of Qing Emperor Jiaqing, these  buildings represent high-rise column-and-tie constructions of the south of China. When the Three Gorges project began, a dam was built around this fortress for its protection.
The Zhang Fei Temple, of Yun Yang County of Chongqing, constructed no later than the Song dynasty, stood on the south bank of the Yangtze River in the northern foothills of the Feng Fei Mountains. Being close to the Yangtze River it was flooded more than once. The present temple is that which was repaired during the reigns of emperors Tongzhi and Guangxu of the Qing dynasty. A large number of calligraphy and paintings, stone inscriptions and woodcarvings from the Tang and Song dynasties, such as the first and second odes on The Red Cliffs by Su Shih, have been saved.

After the construction of the Three Gorges Dam was approved, archaeologists were allowed time and resources to carry out rescue work. However, after the dam was built and used to store water, a large number of cultural relics, including hanging coffins and stone inscriptions that cannot be protected, were covered by the reservoir.

See also
 Baiheliang Underwater Museum
 Chinese yuan note  — the westernmost gorge image is on the ten yuan note.
 Three Gorges Locks
 Three Gorges Museum

References

External links
Google Earth view

AAAAA-rated tourist attractions
Canyons and gorges of China
Landforms of Chongqing
Landforms of Hubei
Tourist attractions in Chongqing
Tourist attractions in Hubei
Yangtze River